Kim Hyang-gi (born August 9, 2000) is a South Korean actress.

Career
Kim began her career as a child actress,  debuting in a Paris Baguette Commercial  alongside her future co-star Jung Woo Sung  and first appeared in the animal film Heart Is...  in 2006 alongside Yoo Seung-ho. Thereafter she starred in melodrama film  Cherry Tomato, which depicts the poverty-stricken life of an old man and his granddaughter. One of Kim's earlier notable roles were in the drama film Wedding Dress where she played Song Yoon-ah's daughter.

In 2013, Kim starred in the television drama The Queen's Classroom, which won her a Best Young Actress Award at the 2013 MBC Drama Awards. Kim next appeared in Thread of Lies, a film adaptation of Kim Ryeo-ryeong's novel Elegant Lies about a willful girl seeking the truth behind her sister's suicide. Her performance as a victim of bully won her the Best New Actress award at the Baeksang Arts Awards.

In 2015, Kim had a lead role in the Drama City television special, Snowy Road. The two-part drama series is about the "comfort women" in Korea under Japanese rule during World War II, and was later released as a film in theaters.

In 2017, Kim starred in the web drama  Sweet Revenge, which earned positive reviews and had over 11 million views online. The same year, she starred in the fantasy blockbuster Along With the Gods: The Two Worlds. The film was the second highest-grossing film in South Korea, and Kim won the Best Supporting Actress award at the Blue Dragon Awards. Kim subsequently reprised her role in the sequel of the film, Along with the Gods: The Last 49 Days.

In 2018, Kim starred in the drama film Youngju, playing a lonely girl whose environment has forced her to grow up too fast. The same year, she was cast in the two-episode romance drama Drunk in Good Taste.

In 2019, Kim reunited with and starred alongside Jung Woo-sung in the drama film Innocent Witness. She earned positive reviews for her portrayal of a girl who suffers from a developmental disorder. She also appeared in the youth drama At Eighteen alongside Ong Seong-wu.

In 2022, Kim appeared in the period war action film Hansan: Rising Dragon, the second installment of Kim Han-min's Yi Sun-sin trilogy, in the role of Jeong Bo-reum, a spy who enters the enemy territory as a courtesan. The same year, she starred in the tvN historical-medical drama Poong, the Joseon Psychiatrist.

Filmography

Film

Television series

Web series

Music video

Discography

Singles

Awards and nominations

Notes

References

External links
 Kim Hyang-gi at Namoo Actors
 
 
 

2000 births
Living people
South Korean child actresses
South Korean television actresses
South Korean film actresses
South Korean web series actresses
21st-century South Korean actresses
Best New Actress Paeksang Arts Award (film) winners